Dominic Frederick Sigillo (March 7, 1913 – July 1, 1957) was an American football tackle who played three seasons in the National Football League with the Chicago Bears and Detroit Lions. He played college football at Xavier University and attended Central High School in Columbus, Ohio.

References

External links
Just Sports Stats

1913 births
1957 deaths
Players of American football from Connecticut
American football tackles
Xavier Musketeers football players
Chicago Bears players
Detroit Lions players
People from Storrs, Connecticut